Qarah Qishah (also Romanized as Qarah Qīshah; also known as Qaraqeshteh and Qarqashah) is a village in Abbas-e Sharqi Rural District, Tekmeh Dash District, Bostanabad County, East Azerbaijan Province, Iran. At the 2006 census, its population was 260, in 66 families.

References 

Populated places in Bostanabad County